Eskadrille 724 is a Royal Danish Air Force helicopter squadron, housed at Karup Air Base in central Jutland.

It was official erected on 7 August 2003, when the Danish army's Royal Danish Army Air Corps (HFT) was disbanded and transformed into Eskadrille 724. The name "Hærens Flyvetjeneste" was used onto August 2005.

The squadron consist of 12 AS 550 Fennec. In the Danish Defence agreement 2005-09, Eskadrille 724 is to be disbanded; the Fennec helicopter loses its anti-tank capability and will likely be used in a light transport- and observation unit.

Until 12 September 2005 the squadron also operated 10 H-500 Cayuse helicopters.

Previous Eskadrille 724
A previous Eskadrille 724 did exist in the Danish air force.

On 8 January 1951 Eskadrille 724 was established at Karup Air Base and in a matter of months equipped with 20 Gloster Meteor fighters. In June 1952 the squadron moved to Aalborg Air Base and in 1956 it was equipped with Hawker Hunter fighters. In 1958 it moved back to Karup Air Base, but already in 1959 it was moved again, this time to Skrydstrup Air base.

With the Danish defence agreement on 26 April 1973, Eskadrille 724 was to be disbanded. The last Hawker Hunter fighter was flown to Aalborg Air Base on 30 March 1974, to be disbanded and stored.

Sources
 FOV Newsletter no.15, 2003 
 Karup Air Base tjenestestedsblad "Vindposen", December 2003
 FLV12-okt2005

Danish Air Force squadrons
History of Aalborg